Rue de Rome is the name of a number of streets:

Canada 

 Rue de Rome (Montreal), in Montreal

Belgium 
 Rue de Rome (Brussels), in Brussels

France 
 Rue de Rome (Marseille), in Marseille
 Rue de Rome (Paris), in Paris
 Rue de Rome (Tampon), in Le Tampon, Réunion

Tunisia 
 Rue de Rome (Tunis), in Tunis